Clathrina pedunculata is a species of calcareous sponges from Australia.

References

Sponges described in 1885
Sponges of Australia